The Mukje Conference was held on 1–3 August 1943 in Mukaj (near Krujë in Central Albania). There was signed the Mukje agreement, a treaty between the nationalist Balli Kombëtar and the National Liberation Movement representatives. The aim was to generate a platform on how to regulate the Albanian resistance in World War II and how to prepare for the future of Ethnic Albanian state. The National Liberation Movement included the Communists and Legaliteti of Abaz Kupi, as well as smaller local nationalist leaders. The conference was intermediated by the British emissaries with the idea of unifying the Albanian political spectrum against the Fascists, similar to AVNOJ in Yugoslavia.

The agreement established a Committee of National Salvation which should take the lead over the Albanian resistance movement. The movement would take into consideration the Albanian national cause, making possible the creation of a Greater Albania, with the annexation of Albanian populated areas to a post-war Albanian state. On the part of the National Liberation Movement, the delegation was led by Ymer Dishnica, a member of the Politburo of the Central Committee of the Communist Party of Albania and Mustafa Gjinishi. Balli Kombëtar was represented by Skënder Muço, Hysni Lepenica, Mit’hat Frashëri, and Hasan Dosti (head of delegation) between others. A dispute arose concerning the status of Kosovo. Whereas the National Front proposed to fight for the integration of Kosova into Albania, the Communist representatives objected fiercely. The agreement holds twelve signatures from each side.

Since the agreement included strong notes of nationalism with a potential of future border disputes which could jeopardize relations between Albania and Yugoslavia, it was considered counterrevolutionary by the Communist Party of Yugoslavia, whose delegate Svetozar Vukmanović-Tempo exerted considerable influence over the Albanian communists. Consequently, the agreement was formally denounced several days later in a meeting of the Central Committee of the Communist Party of Albania in Labinot, repeated during the second Conference of the National Liberation Movement still in Labinot one month later. The agreement would be criticized as "a betrayal of the people and revolution" and "against the fundamental principles of the Conference of Pezë".

After failure of the agreement, Balli Kombëtar chose to openly collaborate with the Germans after the capitulation of Italy, while the Communist Party of Albania continued to fight alongside the Yugoslav Partisans. Legaliteti would continue fighting against the fascist armies, but the distance between them and the Communists would get larger and larger. The communists would consider them counterrevolutionary by the end of the war.

The communists' history in the following decades would criticize the agreement and its protagonists (including Dishnica and Gjinishi), and consider it a trap from the Balli side.

Sources

References 

1943 in Albania
Albania in World War II
1943 conferences